Cerasicoccus arenae is a Gram-negative, obligately aerobic and non-spore-forming bacterium from the genus of Cerasicoccus which has been isolated frpm marine sand from Kamaishi. Cerasicoccus arenae can produce carotenoid.

References

Verrucomicrobiota
Bacteria described in 2007